During the 2005–06 English football season, Sheffield Wednesday F.C. competed in the Football League Championship.

Season summary
In the 2005–06 Championship campaign, the Owls' final league position of 19th place wasn't bad considering the current financial situation of the club. For the second successive year targets have been achieved – the season's target had been avoiding relegation.

On 17 April 2006, Sheffield Wednesday retained their place in the Championship with two matches remaining, with a 2–0 away win at Brighton, condemning Brighton, Millwall and Crewe to the drop in the process. Wednesday went on to finish the season in 19th place, 10 points clear of the relegation zone.

Wednesday were statistically the best supported team in the Championship with their average home league attendance of 24,853 marginally beating newly relegated Norwich City with 24,833.

Final league table

Results
Sheffield Wednesday's score comes first

Legend

Football League Championship

FA Cup

League Cup

Squad

Left club during season

References

2005-06
Sheffield Wednesday